Filippo Balbi (1806 - 27 September 1890) was an Italian painter, active in an archaic style depicting allegoric and religious scenes.

Early life

Filippo was born in Naples, and studied in the Academy of Fine Arts of his native city, but moved to Rome.

Career

In 1844, one of his first commissions was for a Madonna della Cintura for the Convent of the Madonna della Neve in Frosinone. In 1854, he began to paint a ceiling for the Certosa di Trisulti located in Collepardo, province of Frosinone. 

Much of his life's output after 1859 was for the Certosa, including canvases for the church, lunettes, and eclectic frescoes for the pharmacy. He also painted a Testa anatomica (1854), located now in the Museo di Storia della Medicina of the Sapienza University of Rome in Rome.

He painted an Immaculate Conception (1877) for the Church of the Consolazione in Collepardo, now on display in a chapel of the parish church of Santissimi Salvatore. 

Filippo died in Alatri in 1890.

Gallery

References

1806 births
1890 deaths
19th-century Italian painters
Italian male painters
Accademia di Belle Arti di Napoli alumni
Painters from Naples
19th-century Italian male artists